Britain's Real Monarch is a historical documentary presented by Tony Robinson first shown on Channel 4 on 3 January 2004. It has also been broadcast in Australia and in the United States.  The documentary discusses the descendants of George Plantagenet, Duke of Clarence, and their claim to the throne of England.

Thesis
The programme based its thesis on the centuries-old claim that Edward IV was illegitimate, born to Cecily, Duchess of York, by an English archer (surnamed Blaybourne by some) while her husband, Richard Plantagenet, 3rd Duke of York, was fighting elsewhere in France. A number of historians have since challenged the conclusions reached by the programme.

If Edward were indeed illegitimate, then he and his descendants would have had no valid claim to the throne, so the programme suggests that the 'real' monarchs were the heirs of his legitimate brother George, Duke of Clarence.  At the time, this line was represented by The 14th Earl of Loudoun (who usually styled himself simply as Michael Hastings), who had emigrated to Australia in 1960, married, fathered five children, and lived in Jerilderie, New South Wales, until his death in June 2012.

See also
Alternative successions of the English crown, for the genealogical descent serving as the basis for the show

References

Succession to the British crown
British monarchy
British television documentaries
Channel 4 original programming
2004 television specials
Documentary films about British royalty
British television films
2000s British films